Grabom is a settlement near Brojë in the former Kelmend municipality, Shkodër County, northern Albania. Near this village a new border crossing point between Albania and Montenegro is planned.

Gallery

References

Kelmend (municipality)
Populated places in Malësi e Madhe
Albania–Montenegro border crossings